Yves Bouquel (born 10 March 1955) is a French gymnast. He competed in eight events at the 1980 Summer Olympics.

References

1955 births
Living people
French male artistic gymnasts
Olympic gymnasts of France
Gymnasts at the 1980 Summer Olympics
Place of birth missing (living people)